The Perro Majorero (English: Majorero dog) is a Spanish breed from the Canary Islands. Traditionally, it has been used as a cattle dog and guard dog.

History 

The word Mahorero (Majorero) is a Guanche word still used today to describe the people of Fuerteventura. In 1979, in the municipality of Tuineje, the first monographic of the breed was held in Gran Tarajal, bringing together farmers, experts and judges, being the beginning of the process for recognition of the breed by the Real Sociedad Canina de España, thanks to the work of recovery and diffusion of the breed by the Protective Society in Fuerteventura. However, it was not until 14 April 1994 that the Real Sociedad Canina de España recognized the Perro Majorero as a native canine breed.

For various reasons, including the abandonment of the primary sector, or the introduction of foreign breeds on the island, the breed entered into a steep decline, which led to the edge of extinction. There was no specific plan of breeding and selection to change the fate of the Perro Majorero. Also, the existing speculation had reduced the breed's quality. For these reasons, the "Association for the Conservation of the Perro Majorero" (ACPM) was founded, born as an initiative from the hands of breeders, owners and fans in order to safeguard and promote the survival of the Perro Majorero. Some of its objectives, such as starting to build a love for this breed again in the island of Fuerteventura, are being achieved. The ACPM has set up a specific plan of breeding for selection and improvement of Perros Majoreros. One of its lines of work has been the campaigns of sale of puppies amongst its members and between farmers to be used in the rugged and repopulate the island with exemplars of good breed quality and known genealogy.

See also
 Dogs portal
 List of dog breeds

References

External links 
 Association for the Conservation of the Perro Majorero (Asociación para la Conservación del Perro Majorero) page
 Real Sociedad Canina de España Group 1

Fuerteventura
Dog breeds originating in the Canary Islands